Georgene is an English given name and a feminine form of George. It is a variant of the French Georgine.

People 

 Georgene Faulkner (1873–1958), American children's book author and storyteller 
 Georgene Louis American attorney and politician
 Georgene Hoffman Seward (1902–1992), American feminist psychologist

References 

Feminine given names